The house at 343 Highland Avenue is a historic two-family house in Somerville, Massachusetts.  The 2.5-story wood-frame Queen Anne style house was built c. 1880 as commuter housing.  The house features jigsaw-cut bargeboard decoration on the porches, and paired brackets in the eaves and gables.  It was built on land that had been part of a brickyard, which was subdivided for development in the 1870s.

The house was listed on the National Register of Historic Places in 1989.

See also
National Register of Historic Places listings in Somerville, Massachusetts

References

Houses completed in 1880
Houses on the National Register of Historic Places in Somerville, Massachusetts